The men's middleweight (75 kg/165 lbs) Full-Contact category at the W.A.K.O. European Championships 2004 in Budva was the fifth heaviest  of the male Full-Contact tournaments and involved ten participants.  Each of the matches was three rounds of two minutes each and were fought under Full-Contact kickboxing rules.

As there were too few men for a tournament designed for sixteen, eight of the fighters received byes into the quarter finals.  The tournament winner was the Russian Belooussov Konstantine who defeated Markus Hakulinen from Finland in the gold medal match by unanimous decision.  Martin Milov from Bulgaria and Germany's Frank Witte were awarded bronze medals.

Results

Key

See also
List of WAKO Amateur European Championships
List of WAKO Amateur World Championships
List of male kickboxers

References

External links
 WAKO World Association of Kickboxing Organizations Official Site

W.A.K.O. European Championships 2004 (Budva)